Albany Regional Airport  is an airport serving Albany, Western Australia.

Also known as Harry Riggs Albany Regional Airport, it is the largest airport in the Great Southern region. The IATA airport code is sometimes listed as ABA and the ICAO airport code was previously YPAL.

The Royal Flying Doctors Service, general charter flights and Royal Australian Air Force (RAAF) flights are also serviced by the airport.

Facilities

The airport was previously equipped with an instrument landing system which has been decommissioned. The sealed  runway is capable of allowing a Boeing 737 aircraft to land.

Airlines and destinations

Passenger

Statistics
Albany Airport was ranked 57th in Australia for the number of revenue passengers served in financial year 2010–2011.

See also
 List of airports in Western Australia
 Aviation transport in Australia

References

External links
 Airservices Aerodromes & Procedure Charts

Airports in Western Australia
Buildings and structures in Albany, Western Australia